Macrocoma splendens is a species of leaf beetle endemic to the Canary Islands. It was first described by Harald Lindberg in 1950. It is reported from Tenerife, La Palma and La Gomera.

References

splendens
Endemic beetles of the Canary Islands
Beetles described in 1950